Hedge is a surname.

Notable people 
 Alf Hedge (1917–1942), Australian footballer
 Andrew Hedge (born 1973), Anglican Bishop from New Zealand
 Frederic Henry Hedge (1805–1890), American Unitarian minister
 H. Kay Hedge (1928–2016), American politician in the state of Iowa
 Homer Hedge (1863–1909), American advertising executive
 Ian Charleson Hedge (born 1928), Scottish botanist
 Isaiah H. Hedge (1812–1888), American physician, businessman, abolitionist and philanthropist
 Levi Hedge (1766–1844), American educator
 Nathan Hedge (born 1979), Australian surfer
 Nathaniel Hedge (1710–?)
 Thomas Hedge (1844–1920), American politician in the state of Iowa
 Trevor Hedge (born 1943)

Fictional characters 
Gleeson Hedge, a satyr in the Heroes of Olympus books series by Rick Riordan

See also 
 Hedge Thompson (1780–1828), American politician from New Jersey